A small hill, Midayikunnam lies near Thalayolaparambu in Kottayam District. It is situated on the Kottayam - Ernakulam route and is easily accessible by local buses from Kottayam. 
Pundareekapuram Temple, a shrine dedicated to Lord Vishnu, is located atop the hill. The temple is noted for its mural collections.

The prestigious Devaswom Board College, Thalayolaparambu adorns the crown of Midayikunnam in Thalayolaparambu with all its splendor and glory. The Devaswom Board College, Thalayolaparambu, the second educational institution of its kind managed by the Travancore Devaswom Board, was established in the year 1965. The college is affiliated to the Mahatma Gandhi University, Kottayam. The college had its affiliation to the Kerala University in the beginning and when the Mahatma Gandhi University, Kottayam was established in 1983, the college came under its jurisdiction.

Midayikunnam have a sub post office of Thalayolaparambu and the postal code is 686605. The Govt L.P (Lower Primary) school, Midayikunnam is situated near the Pundareekapuram Temple.
 
! Village  
! District 
! State    
! Country  
|-
| Thalayolaparambu
| Vadayar
| Kottayam
| Kerala
| India
|}

References 
 http://www.india9.com/i9show/Midayikunnam-72533.htm

Geography of Kottayam district